Calwalla is a small village in the Southern Highlands of New South Wales, Australia, in Wingecarribee Shire.

Transport 
The village was served by a station on the Unanderra-Moss Vale railway line, which opened in 1932 and closed in 1976. It has subsequently been demolished and little trace remains.

References 

Towns of the Southern Highlands (New South Wales)